Yunaska is an uninhabited island which is the largest of the Islands of Four Mountains group in the Aleutian Islands of southwestern Alaska, United States. It has a land area of  according to the 2000 census.

The island comprises two volcanic mountains, with a valley between. The western mountain is composed of four overlapping and eroded stratovolcanoes, with a cinder cone field at the western end. It has not been historically active. The eastern mountain is a large shield volcano with two overlapping summit calderas, which last erupted in 1937.

References

Yunaska Island: Block 1081, Census Tract 1, Aleutians West Census Area, Alaska United States Census Bureau
Yunaska description and statistics, Alaskan Volcano Observatory.
T.P. Miller, R.G. McGimsey, D.H. Richter, J.R. Riehle, C.J. Nye, M.E. Yount, and J.A. Dumoulin,1998. Catalog of the Historically Active Volcanoes of Alaska. USGS, pp.69-70.

External links

Islands of Four Mountains
Calderas of Alaska
Islands of Alaska
Islands of Unorganized Borough, Alaska
Volcanoes of Unorganized Borough, Alaska
Landforms of Aleutians West Census Area, Alaska
Uninhabited islands of Alaska